Raj Bhavan (translation: Government House) of Nagpur is the Second residence of the Governor of Maharashtra,  It is located in the Second Capital city of the state Maharashtra: Nagpur.

History

Raj Bhavan or Government House was built in 1866.

In its more than 110 years of existence, this building was used as 

 House of the Chief Commissioner of Central Province in 1891 
 House of the Chief Commissioner of Central Province and Berar in 1903
 Government House of the Governor of the Central Provinces and Berar in 1920 
 Government House of the Governor of Madhya Pradesh in 1950
 Government House of the Governor of Bombay State in 1956 
 Government House of the Governor of Maharashtra in 1960 

In 1988 it became the Second house of the Governor of Maharashtra in Nagpur the Second Capital city of Maharashtra and its name change to Raj Bhavan (Hindi for Government House).

See also
  Government Houses of the British Indian Empire

References

External links
http://rajbhavan.maharashtra.gov.in

Governors' houses in Maharashtra
Buildings and structures in Nagpur
Houses completed in 1866
1920 establishments in India